Patrick Lionel Djargun Dodson (born 29 January 1948) is an Australian politician representing Western Australia in the Australian Senate. He is a Yawuru elder from Broome, Western Australia. He has been chairman of the Council for Aboriginal Reconciliation, a Commissioner into Aboriginal Deaths in Custody, and a Roman Catholic priest. He was the winner of the 2008 Sydney Peace Prize and the 2009 John Curtin Medallist. His brother is Mick Dodson, also a national Indigenous Australian leader.

On 2 March 2016, Dodson was announced as the replacement for Joe Bullock as a Labor Senator for Western Australia, following Bullock's resignation. The Parliament of Western Australia appointed Dodson to the Australian Senate on 2 May 2016.

Early life and priesthood
Dodson was born on 29 January 1948 in Broome. His father, John "Snowy" Dodson, was born in Launceston, Tasmania and his mother, Patricia, was an Indigenous Australian. The family moved to Katherine in the Northern Territory when Pat was two, to escape Western Australian laws banning race-mix families.

The Dodson children were orphaned at the deaths of both parents only three months apart in 1960. He and his brother Mick were made wards of the state, but their aunt and uncle decided they should accept a scholarship to study at Monivae College in Hamilton, Victoria, where Dodson became head prefect and captain of football. After completing his schooling, Patrick enrolled to study for the priesthood at Corpus Christi College, Melbourne, and was ordained in the order of the Missionaries of the Sacred Heart in May 1975. He was the first Aboriginal person to become a Catholic priest in Australia. He left the priesthood in the early 1980s due to conflict over the balance and blend of Catholicism and Aboriginal spiritual belief.

Public service

Dodson lives in Broome where he is also involved in matters relating to the preservation and development of Indigenous rights and culture. Some of the prominent roles and positions he has held include:
Director of the Central Land Council and the Kimberley Land Council
Commissioner into Aboriginal Deaths in Custody, 1989
Chairman of the Council for Aboriginal Reconciliation (1991–1997) (This body was replaced by Reconciliation Australia). He retired stating "I fear for the spirit of this country".
Adjunct Professor at the University of Notre Dame Australia.
Chairperson, Kimberley Development Commission (his term expired in November 2010)
Chairman of the Lingiari Foundation, an Indigenous non-government advocacy and research Foundation.
Inaugural Director of the Indigenous Policy, Dialogue and Research Unit (IPDRU) at the University of New South Wales
Chairman of the Yawuru Native Title Holders Body Corporate (2010–2013) and Nyamba Buru Yawuru Ltd (to 2015)

Politics

The Parliament of Western Australia appointed Dodson to fill a casual vacancy in the Australian Senate on 2 May 2016, following the resignation of Labor senator Joe Bullock. He was sworn in as a senator on the same day, and sat as a Labor senator for Western Australia. He retained his seat at the 2016 federal election. He has served on a number of Senate committees, notably as joint chair of the Joint Select Committee into Constitutional Recognition relating to Aboriginal and Torres Strait Islander Peoples.

Dodson was added to the shadow ministry in May 2016, as a shadow assistant minister. He was initially appointed shadow parliamentary secretary to the Leader of the Opposition, and in July 2016 has been shadow assistant minister for indigenous affairs and Aboriginal and Torres Strait Islanders. Opposition Leader Bill Shorten promised to appoint Dodson as Minister for Indigenous Affairs if the ALP won the 2019 federal election. This did not eventuate, and Dodson, while re-elected to the Senate, did not stand for re-election to the Labor frontbench.

As the shadow assistant minister for reconciliation and constitutional recognition, Dodson supported the Uluru Statement from the Heart in full.

Dodson served on the "Inquiry into the destruction of 46,000 year old caves at the Juukan Gorge in the Pilbara region of Western Australia", which delivered its interim report in December 2020.

Following Labor's victory at the 2022 federal election, Dodson was appointed Special Envoy for Reconciliation and Implementation of the Uluru Statement from the Heart by Prime Minister Anthony Albanese.

Honours
Dodson holds an Honorary Doctor of Laws degree from the University of Melbourne and an Honorary Doctor of Letters degree from the University of New South Wales.

In 2012 he gave the inaugural Gandhi Oration at the University of New South Wales.

References

Other sources
Kevin Keeffe, (2003) ''Paddy's Road: Life Stories of Patrick Dodson" Aboriginal Studies Press, Canberra

External links

Patrick Dodson - A Life Story Local ABC NSW Tuesday, 2 September 2003 [Accessed 10 February 2006]
Bio at Kimberley Development Commission website
Heroes: Pat Dodson at Universal Rights Network
Bio at The University of New South Wales

1948 births
Living people
Members of the Australian Senate
Members of the Australian Senate for Western Australia
Australian Labor Party members of the Parliament of Australia
Labor Right politicians
People from Broome, Western Australia
Indigenous Australians from Western Australia
Australian indigenous rights activists
Indigenous Australian politicians
21st-century Australian politicians
Australian Roman Catholic priests
Missionaries of the Sacred Heart
Indigenous Australian clergy
Australian Aboriginal elders